At Home by Myself...With You is a 2009 Canadian comedy-drama film directed by Kris Booth and co-written with Ramona Barckert. It premiered at the 2009 Vancouver Film Festival.

Premise
A woman with many phobias hasn't left her apartment in six years but has fallen for a handsome man who has moved in across the hall.

Cast

Production
The director, Kris Booth, put a tip jar on his desk at work for spare change. At the end of the year, $42,000 was raised and after viewing a rough draft, Telefilm Canada took over production costs. Film production took two years, and it was shot over the course of 17 days, including two insert days.

External links 
 

2009 films
2000s English-language films
2009 comedy-drama films
Canadian comedy-drama films
English-language Canadian films
Films shot in Toronto
2000s Canadian films